Diva Universal was an Italian television channel owned by Universal Networks International Italia, and broadcast on SKY Italia Channel 128 (Entertainment package).

Until 31 March 2011, the channel was named Hallmark Channel.

Hallmark Channel was owned by the privately backed Sparrowhawk Media Group, until late 2007 when the company was bought by NBCUniversal.

On 30 June 2015, Diva Universal Italy was permanently discontinued at midnight.

Programmes 
 7th Heaven
 A Touch of Frost
 Agatha Christie's Poirot
 Dallas
 Dalziel and Pascoe
 Diagnosis Murder
 Doc Martin
 Downton Abbey
 Father Dowling Mysteries
 Inspector Morse
 Intelligence
 Judging Amy
 Kojak
 L.A. Dragnet
 Lewis
 McLeod's Daughters
 Ghost Squad
 Miami Vice
 Monk
 Rain Shadow
 Spooks
 The 10th Kingdom
 The Agency
 Two Twisted
 Wild at Heart

See also
 Hallmark Channel
 Hallmark Channel (International)
 Hallmark Channel (UK)

References

External links
 Official Site 

Defunct television channels in Italy
Universal Networks International
Television channels and stations established in 2005
Television channels and stations disestablished in 2015
2005 establishments in Italy
2015 disestablishments in Italy
Italian-language television stations